Niagara University (NU) is a private Catholic university in the Vincentian tradition in Lewiston in Niagara County, New York. It is run by the Congregation of the Mission and has 3,300 undergraduate students in 50 academic programs. Approximately half of the students are residents while the other half commute from the surrounding area. It was listed as a census-designated place in 2020.

History 
Founded by the Congregation of the Mission on 21 November 1856 as Our Lady of Angels Seminary, the school moved from Buffalo to its current location on May 1, 1857. After 26 years on its new campus, The college and Seminary of Our Lady of Angels. It officially changed its name to Niagara University on August 7, 1883. In 1887, the university opened a Law school in Buffalo, what is now the University at Buffalo Law School after being acquired by the University at Buffalo in 1891.

The university is still run by the Vincentian Fathers. All of Niagara's 26 presidents, including its current president, Rev. James J. Maher, C.M., have been Vincentian priests.

Rankings 
In 2017, Niagara University was ranked 44th by U.S. News & World Report in the "Regional Universities North" category and tied for 25th under best colleges for veterans. The magazine also ranked Niagara University ninth as the best value schools in the same category. Taking into account educational quality, affordability, and alumni success, Money Magazine ranked Niagara University as the best college or university in the Buffalo-Niagara region in 2017 when it comes to delivering the most value for a student's educational dollar. Kiplinger's Personal Finance ranked Niagara University 82nd in the magazine's list of the 100 best values among private universities.

Academics 
Undergraduate students are able to choose an area of study in any of Niagara's five academic colleges. In addition to the College of Arts and Sciences, Holzschuh College of Business Administration, College of Education, College of Nursing, and the College of Hospitality and Tourism Management, Niagara's Academic Exploration Program allows first and second year students take courses in various departments before deciding on a major.

The university also offers academic programs in Canada which operate under the written consent of the Ministry of Training, Colleges and Universities of Ontario. The Niagara University in Ontario, located in Vaughan, offers a bachelor's degree in Professional Studies in Education program (accredited by the Ontario College of Teachers) and the Master of Science degree in education.  In 2019, Niagara University expanded their degree offerings with a Master of Business Administration (MBA), a Master of Science in finance (MSF), and a Master of Science in Information and Security and Digital Forensics (MSISDF). The university also offers Ontario-based Additional Qualifications for the teacher profession.

College of Arts and Sciences 
The College of Arts and Sciences forms the foundation of the Niagara University's curriculum and serves as the basis for its designation as a liberal arts college. All Niagara students complete a portion of their coursework in the College of Arts and Sciences, as numerous general education courses are housed within this unit.

In 2008, Niagara University announced that a $10 million gift, the largest gift in the university's history, had been made to the College of Arts and Sciences by B. Thomas Golisano, the CEO of Paychex and the former owner of the Buffalo Sabres. The gift funded the construction of the B. Thomas Golisano Center for Integrated Sciences. The school broke ground on the center during the 2011–2012 school year and the  facility opened in August 2013.

Holzschuh College of Business Administration 
The business college includes programs in accounting, economics, finance, management, and marketing. The College of Business is accredited by AASCB International and has maintained accreditation since 2001. The university renamed the college of business to the Holzschuh College of Business Administration in 2022.

Residence life 

Niagara University features five traditional residence halls, as well as six community houses called the Varsity Village and on-campus student apartments. Traditional buildings include Clet, Lynch, O’Donoughue, O'Shea, and Seton Halls.

Campus activities 
The Campus Activities Office, along with the Niagara University Student Government Association, sponsors numerous opportunities to get involved in campus life, including concerts, comedians, and weekly late-night events. Currently Tau Kappa Epsilon is the only fraternity active on Niagara University's campus. There are also two active national sororities, Alpha Sigma Alpha and Phi Sigma Sigma.  In addition to these, there are many clubs which celebrate and support cultural diversity, under the auspices of the Office of Multicultural Affairs.

Castellani Art Museum 
The Castellani Art Museum of Niagara University is centrally located on the main campus and is Niagara County's only collecting museum. The museum features exhibitions of contemporary artists and traditional folk arts.  The museum owns a permanent collection of over 5,700 art works, most of which are from the 19th-century, modern and contemporary art movements.

The Niagara University Fine Arts Program has studio and classroom space in the Museum for students. Docent and volunteer programs are offered to any interested member of the community. The bachelor's degree in Art History with Museum Studies has been offered since the fall of 2013, and is now one of the very few places in the country that offer Museum Studies at an undergraduate level.

Athletics 

The Niagara University Athletics Department sponsors 18 Division I sports. The Purple Eagles compete in the Metro Atlantic Athletic Conference (MAAC) in all sports except ice hockey. The men's ice hockey team competes in Atlantic Hockey. Niagara named Simon Gray as its athletics director on May 16, 2014.

The men's basketball team won the MAAC Championship in 2005 and in 2007, earning automatic bids to the 2005 and 2007's NCAA tournaments, known colloquially as the "Big Dance". Niagara's first appearance in the Dance came in 1970, when All-American Calvin Murphy led the Purple Eagles to the Sweet Sixteen. On March 13, 2007, Niagara defeated Florida A&M 77–69 in the so-called "Play-In Game". NU was crowned the 2012-2013 MAAC regular season champions. This title earned them an automatic bid into the NIT where they faced the University of Maryland in the first round.

The men's hockey team won the College Hockey America Championship in 2000, 2004 and 2008, appearing in the NCAA Men's Ice Hockey Championship those years. In 2000, the "Purps" pulled an upset against University of New Hampshire to advance to the Elite Eight.

Two years later, the women's hockey team, under head coach Margot Page, shocked the college hockey world by advancing to the Frozen Four, eventually tying the University of Minnesota in the third-place game.

Five other Niagara teams have advanced to the NCAA Tournament in their respective sports: softball (1998); women's soccer (2006); women's tennis (2003 & 2005); Men's soccer (2012);  women's volleyball (2009, 2010 & 2011).

Clubs 
During the 2019-2020 School Year, NU teams competed in Men's Baseball, Basketball, Ice Hockey, Lacrosse, Rugby, Soccer and Volleyball at the club level. Women teams competed in Basketball, Lacrosse, Rugby, Soccer, Softball, and Volleyball while Co-Ed teams competed in E-Sports, Field Hockey and Golf. Badminton, Roller Hockey, Running, and Tennis clubs have also been active on campus in prior years.

Intramurals 
The Athletics Department also operates the Kiernan Center – Niagara's on-campus fitness facility – and sponsors a comprehensive slate of intramural sports, including basketball, broomball, flag football, indoor soccer, softball, street hockey, and rugby union.

Notable alumni 

Niagara has approximately 40,000 living alumni worldwide. Niagara alumni are distinguishing themselves in the fields of academics, government, law, religion, and sports

 In academia, Niagara alumni include: Teresa J. Domzal, former Dean of the George Mason University School of Management; Dennis Holtschneider, President of DePaul University; David M. O'Connell, Bishop of the Diocese of Trenton, NJ; and David Sylvester, President of the University of St. Michael's College
 In the field of government, Niagara alumni include: William J. Donovan, Former Ambassador to Thailand and Father of Military Intelligence; Alfred F. Beiter, former U.S. Representative from New York; Thomas F. Burchill, former U.S. Representative from New York; Joseph L. Carrigg, former U.S. Representative from Pennsylvania; Leo W. O'Brien, former U.S. Representative from New York; Gilbert Parent, former Speaker of the House of Commons of Canada; and Dan Schaefer, U.S. Representative from Colorado; John Katko, U.S. Representative for the 24th District of New York
 In the field of law, Niagara alumni include: Frank D. O'Connor, former Judge on the New York Supreme Court, Appellate Division; Hugh B. Scott, Magistrate Judge of the United States District Court for the Western District of New York and the first African American to become an Assistant United States Attorney; Frederick J. Scullin, Senior Judge on the United States District Court for the Northern District of New York; before becoming a U.S. Representative, John Katko was an Assistant United States Attorney who led the organized crime division at the U.S. Attorney's Office in Syracuse
 In the field of religion, Niagara alumni include: Venerable Nelson Baker, Founder of the "City of Charity" and candidate for canonization; Michael J. McGivney, Founder of the Knights of Columbus; Anthony Raymond Ceresko, Old Testament scholar; and several American prelates of the Roman Catholic Church including Octavio Cisneros, Edmund Michael Dunne, Joseph Lennox Federal, Edmund Gibbons, Thomas Francis Lillis, James Johnston Navagh, and Donald Walter Trautman.
 In the field of sports, Niagara alumni include: Hubie Brown, two-time NBA Coach of the Year and Basketball Hall of Fame member; Larry Costello, six-time NBA All-Star and NBA coach; Frank Layden, NBA Coach of the Year and Executive of the Year; Calvin Murphy, three-time All-American, NBA All-Star and Basketball Hall of Fame member; Sal Maglie, two-time MLB National League All-Star; Joe McCarthy, seven-time MLB World Series Champion and National Baseball Hall of Fame and Museum member; Matt Brash, starting pitcher for the Seattle Mariners; and Wynton Bernard, outfielder for the Colorado Rockies.
 Other notable Niagara alumni include: Bill Press, host of nationally syndicated radio talk show and former co-host of CNN's Crossfire; John O'Hara, best-selling novelist and National Book Award winner; Michael Scheuer, former CIA Chief of the Bin Laden Issue Station and author of Imperial Hubris; and Robert Wegman, founder of Wegmans Food Markets.

References

External links 

 
 Niagara Athletics website

 
Association of Catholic Colleges and Universities
Educational institutions established in 1856
Education in Niagara County, New York
Catholic universities and colleges in New York (state)
1856 establishments in New York (state)
Universities in Ontario